The Regional Council of Île-de-France is the regional council of Île-de-France, France's most populous administrative region. Made up of 209 regional councillors elected for 6 years, it is headquartered in Saint-Ouen-sur-Seine, just north of Paris. The council has been presided over since 18 December 2015 by Valérie Pécresse. She succeeded Jean-Paul Huchon, who had presided over the council since 23 March 1998.

Finances

List of presidents of the Regional Council

Current composition

Assembly

Vice-presidencies 
The new executive formed in 2021 has, in addition to the president, fifteen vice-presidents.

Special Delegates 
Valérie Pécresse also appointed 18 special delegates in charge of “strategic issues”:

Headquarters 
A selection process led in May 2016 to retain three potential sites, where the move could be done quickly, in Ivry-sur-Seine, Saint-Denis and Saint-Ouen. In early 2018, the construction of the new site started in the district of Docks in Saint-Ouen, moving from its previous office in the 7th arrondissement. The second building, including a hemicycle, was delivered in 2019. The first plenary meeting of the regional council in Saint-Ouen was announced to be held in March 2020. The site is served by Mairie de Saint-Ouen Paris Métro station.

Visual identity (logo) 

Since 2005, the logo of the Île-de-France region has been composed of an eight-pointed star of red-orange color next to the name of the region in lowercase. The eight branches of the star, already present on the previous logo, symbolized the eight Île-de-France départements. The creation of the logo would have costed 40,000 euros and the change of letterhead that it entailed more than 100,000 euros.

Regional Councilors' Scarf 
The scarf worn by the regional councilors who are members of the Île-de-France Regional Council is red (narrow band), white (narrow band), blue, white (narrow band), red (narrow band).

Regional Youth Council of Île-de-France 
The Conseil régional des jeunes d'Île-de-France (CRJ or ) is an assembly created by the regional council of Île-de-France. It is made up of 148 full advisors.

The advisers meet in plenary session in the hemicycle of the regional council 3 times a year and sit on several committees:

 Guidance, Studies, Employment
 Transport
 Europe
 Health
 Commission Against Discrimination
 Gender Equality

In plenary session, 2 voluntary moderators are drawn to lead this session.

References 

Île-de-France
Politics of Île-de-France